The Breda A.7 was a reconnaissance aircraft developed in Italy for use by the Regia Aeronautica in 1929. It was a braced parasol monoplane of conventional configuration with tailskid undercarriage. The pilot and observer sat in tandem, open cockpits. A single prototype of a long-range example, originally designated A.7 Raid and later A.16 (or Ba.16) was also constructed, but the air force showed no interest in it.

Variants
A.7LD Two prototypes, powered by  Lorraine-Dietrich piston engines. (2 built).
A.7Production version. Two-seat reconnaissance aircraft, powered by a  Isotta Fraschini Asso 500 piston engine, and fitted with a revised cooling system and empennage; 12 built.
A.7 Raid (later A.16 or Ba.16)  A long-range version, powered by a  Isotta Fraschini Asso 500 AQ engine. Engine later changed to a Bristol Jupiter VII and an extra seat added.
A.7Idro Seaplane fitted with twin floats.

Ba.16 a long-range version; one built.

Operators

 Regia Aeronautica

Specifications (A.7)

See also

References

 
 

A.7
1920s Italian military reconnaissance aircraft
Single-engined tractor aircraft
Parasol-wing aircraft
Aircraft first flown in 1929